Yondonwangchug (1870 – March 24, 1938) was an Inner Mongolian nobleman of Ulanqab League and politician under the Qing Dynasty, Republic of China and Mengjiang governments.

Names

Career
Yondonwangchug was born in 1870 in what is today Darhan Muminggan United Banner. In his early years, he studied the Tibetan and Chinese languages. He became deputy head of Ulanqab League in 1896. In 1924, he established the banner's first school.

In 1934, he took up the chairmanship of the Mongol Local Autonomy Political Affairs Committee under the Nanjing government. However, he was frustrated by its limited authority and clashes with Suiyuan Province authorities under Fu Zuoyi. Angered by Shirabdorji's uncooperative attitude towards the Committee, in October 1935 Yondonwangchug attempted to strip Shirabdorji of his titles, and sent troops to Shirabdorji's residence; Shirabdorji responded that the council had no power to order his dismissal or appoint new officials to his positions, which were, after all, hereditary. There, Yondonwangchug's forces clashed with Fu's; the Nanjing government did little to intervene. After he incident he went into virtual retirement, and formally resigned in March 1936. 

Yondonwangchug was named chairman of the pro-Japanese Mongol Military Government when it was established in April 1936. In July 1936, a newspaper account states that he was arrested on a visit to Bailingmiao and held in the military headquarters there, and charged with high treason. In October 1937 he was announced as the chairman of the new Mongol United Autonomous Government. He died in July 1938, reportedly by poisoning.

References

Bibliography

1870 births
1938 deaths
Chinese anti-communists
Mengjiang
Mongol collaborators with Imperial Japan
Mongolian nobility
People from Baotou
Republic of China politicians from Inner Mongolia